The 1929–30 Arkansas Razorbacks men's basketball team represented the University of Arkansas in the 1929–30 college basketball season. The Razorbacks played their home games in Schmidt Gymnasium in Fayetteville, Arkansas. It was Charles Bassett's first season as head coach of the Hogs after coaching the basketball team at Texas A&M for two seasons. Former head coach Francis Schmidt left for TCU after overseeing the creation of Arkansas's basketball program and coaching the Razorbacks to four Southwest Conference titles in his six seasons in Fayetteville. The Razorbacks won their fifth-straight Southwest Conference championship in 1930 with a conference record of 10–2 and 16–7 overall.

Forward and College Football Hall of Fame member Wear Schoonover was named a Second Team All-American and earned First Team All-SWC honors for the third straight season. Center Roy Prewitt joined Schoonover on the First Team, as did guard and future Chicago Cardinals coach Milan Creighton.

Roster

Schedule and Results

Schedule retrieved from HogStats.com.

References

Arkansas Razorbacks
Arkansas Razorbacks men's basketball seasons